Fiona Southorn (born 8 October 1967) is a New Zealand paralympic cyclist who represented New Zealand at the 2004 Summer Paralympics, 2008 Summer Paralympics and the 2012 Summer Paralympics.

Born in Tokoroa and living in Waipu in Northland, Southorn, who is missing her left hand, won a bronze medal in the C5 individual pursuit at the 2012 London Paralympics.

References

External links 
 
 

1967 births
Living people
New Zealand female cyclists
Paralympic cyclists of New Zealand
Paralympic bronze medalists for New Zealand
Paralympic medalists in cycling
Cyclists at the 2012 Summer Paralympics
Cyclists at the 2004 Summer Paralympics
Cyclists at the 2008 Summer Paralympics
Medalists at the 2012 Summer Paralympics
Sportspeople from Tokoroa